Mun Ji-hwan (born 26 July 1994) is a South Korean footballer who plays for Gimcheon Sangmu, on loan from Incheon United.

Career
Mun joined K League 2 side Seongnam FC before the 2017 season.

References

1994 births
Living people
People from Jeonju
South Korean footballers
Association football defenders
Association football midfielders
Seongnam FC players
Incheon United FC players
Gimcheon Sangmu FC players
K League 2 players
K League 1 players
Dankook University alumni
Sportspeople from North Jeolla Province